The Night of Decision is a 1931 American drama film directed by Dimitri Buchowetzki and starring Conrad Veidt, Olga Chekhova, and Peter Voß. Based on the 1928 play  The General by Lajos Zilahy, it is also known by the alternative title of Der General.

It was made at the Joinville Studios in Paris as the German-language version of the Hollywood production The Virtuous Sin. It is a lost film.

Cast

References

Bibliography

External links
 

1931 films
American drama films
1931 drama films
1930s German-language films
Films directed by Dimitri Buchowetzki
Paramount Pictures films
Films shot at Joinville Studios
American multilingual films
American black-and-white films
1931 multilingual films
Films scored by Karl Hajos
1930s American films